Qazi Faez Isa (born 26 October 1959) is a Pakistani jurist who has been a justice of the Supreme Court of Pakistan since 5 September 2014. He is the senior-most Justice in the Supreme Court after the Chief Justice Umar Ata Bandial. Previously, he served as Chief Justice of the Balochistan High Court from 2009 to 2014.

Early life and education 
Isa was born in Quetta, West Pakistan, on 26 October 1959, he is of Hazara origins belonging to the Sheikh Ali tribe. His grandfather fled Afghanistan at the end of the 19th-century due to Hazara persecutions, during the reign of Afghan Emir Abdur Rahman, to then-Balochistan province of British India. He is the son of Qazi Muhammad Isa, an independence movement activist who was a close associate of Muhammad Ali Jinnah and served as the president of Muslim League's Balochistan branch. Isa's grandfather, Qazi Jalaluddin, was also the Prime Minister of Kalat State in British India. The diplomat Ashraf Jehangir Qazi is his first cousin, and Jennifer Musa is his aunt through marriage to his paternal uncle Qazi Muhammad Musa.

He completed his primary and secondary education in Quetta, did his "O" and "A" levels from Karachi Grammar School and went on to do B.A. (Honours) in Law, from London. He did his Bar professional examination from the Inns of Court School of Law, London, and was called to the Bar of England and Wales (Middle Temple, 1982).

Career 
Justice Qazi Faez Isa enrolled as an Advocate of the Balochistan High Court on 30 January 1985 and as an Advocate Supreme Court on 21 March 1998.

He practiced law for over 27 years before all the High Courts of Pakistan, the Federal Shariat Court, and the Supreme Court of Pakistan, and was a member of the Balochistan High Court Bar Association, Sindh High Court Bar Association and Life Member of the Supreme Court Bar Association of Pakistan. Before his elevation, he was a senior partner and head of litigation in one of Pakistan's leading law firms. From time to time he was called upon by the High Courts and the Supreme Court as amicus curiae, and rendered assistance in certain complicated cases. He has also conducted international arbitrations. Innumerable cases, in which he appeared as Counsel, have been reported in law journals.

Prior to his elevation, Justice Isa regularly wrote for Pakistan's premier English newspapers. He co-authored the book 'Mass Media Laws and Regulations in Pakistan' and authored the report: 'Balochistan: case and demand'.

Balochistan High Court 
After the proclamation of emergency of November 3, 2007, Isa elected not to appear before judges who had violated their oath. Subsequently, after the Supreme Court declared the action of November 3, 2007 unconstitutional, all the then judges of the High Court of Balochistan tendered their resignation, and on August 5, 2009 Justice Isa was directly elevated to the position of Chief Justice of the High Court of Balochistan.

At the time of elevation, Justice Isa was the solitary judge in the Balochistan High Court. He thus nominated Judges to re-establish the Court, and re-opened the court in Sibi and Turbat. He went on to upgrade all courts in Balochistan, focusing on facilitating access and providing facilities to the public. 
Isa served as a member of the Pakistan Law and Justice Commission, the National Judicial (Policy Making) Committee and the Federal Judicial Academy. In his capacity as the Chief Justice of the Balochistan High Court, he was also the ex-officio Chairman of the Balochistan Judicial Academy. As the senior most Chief Justice of a High Court Isa served as a member of the Supreme Judicial Council.

Supreme Court of Pakistan 
Justice Qazi Faez Isa took oath as a judge of the Supreme Court of Pakistan on 5 September 2014, where he is currently the senior most Judge.

He strongly dissented in the case of District Bar Association Rawalpindi v Federation of Pakistan, which enabled the trial of civilians by military court. In the case of Sindh Revenue Board v Civil Aviation Authority, he held that 'neither the Federation nor the provinces should invade upon the rights of the other nor encroach on the other's legislative domain'.

In the case of Suo Moto proceedings regarding eligibility of the Chairman, Sindh Public Service Commission, Justice Isa directed the Government of Sindh to 'ensure complete transparency in the process of selection and appointment respectively' of qualified candidates, as their 'performance and work would be far superior to the inept allowed in through the back door of nepotism and/or corruption'.

Justice Isa addressed illegalities in government projects in Suo Moto Case no. 19 of 2016, in which he observed that 'a small clique of persons is put in charge of these massive funds, avoiding established methods of checks and balances and circumventing the prescribed manner of implementing and executing of projects/schemes'.

In the case of Khalid Humayun v NAB, Justice Isa castigated the National Accountability Bureau for entering into a plea bargain with a government servant who was caught red handed with a large amount of cash. He held that 'the acceptance of the plea bargain by the Chairman runs counter to the stated object [of the NAB Ordinance] to ‘eradicate corruption and to hold accountable all those persons accused of such practice’; instead, the message that emanates from NAB is that, if one surrenders only the amount which was seized he will be let off. The rising tide of insidious corruption devastates lives; this Court has repeatedly noted and warned about it, but it seems to no avail'.

Justice Isa was appointed by the Supreme Court as a single Judge Commission regarding terrorist attacks in Quetta on 8 August 2016 wherein 75 people (a majority of whom were lawyers) were killed. Justice Isa submitted the resultant Quetta Commission Report on 13 December 2016. In the judgment of Principal Public School Sangota v Sarbiland, the case of a girls school being attacked by terrorists was addressed by Justice Isa, condemning acts of terrorism by using Islamic injunctions regarding education and non violence.

In the Faizabad dharna judgment, Justice Isa addressed the constitutional right to free movement, steady rise of extremism in Pakistan, and the unconstitutional interference of intelligence agencies in Pakistan's political system. Within the judgment, it was observed that free publicity for extremist parties, and the broadcast of inflammatory speeches had allowed for protests to turn violent and spread across Pakistan. Justice Isa held that rights cannot be exercised by infringing on those of others. Thus, meetings or sit-ins could not be held on public roads without requisite permission. Censorship of the media was noted as unconstitutional, and it was held that 'no one, including any government, department or intelligence agency can curtail the fundamental right of freedom of speech, expression and press beyond the parameters mentioned in Article 19 of the Constitution.' Justice Isa held that 'politicking, and manipulation of media undermines the integrity of the armed forces', and that 'perception of ISI's involvement in matters that are not its concern remains'.

The case of Salamat Mansha Masih v The State involved the bail application of a Christian sanitary worker accused of blasphemy. Justice Isa held that 'abiding by Islamic jurisprudential principles, applying the constitutionally guaranteed right to a fair trial and due process, and acting prudently to ensure that an innocent is not convicted wrongly in respect of offences relating to religion, when there is only the improbable oral testimony of witnesses, then there must be corroboration'. Amnesty International described the judgment as 'a flicker of hope for human rights in South Asia'.

In Shah Zaman v Government of Khyber Pakhtunkhwa, Justice Isa addressed the importance of forests in ecological preservation and mitigating the effects of climate change in light of Islamic injunctions.

Presidential Reference 
In May 2019, 3 months after the release of the Faizabad dharna judgment, the President of Pakistan, on the advice of the Prime Minister, filed a reference against Justice Qazi Faez Isa. The reference was later struck down by the Supreme Court.

It was alleged that properties belonging to Justice Isa's wife, Mrs. Sarina Isa, were actually his own, without issuing notice to her, or hearing her point of view. Mrs. Isa successfully challenged the order, establishing that she had an independent means of livelihood and was a separate taxpayer, since she started working in 1981.

In its detailed judgment, the Supreme Court found that the Reference filed against Justice Isa had been in 'wanton disregard of the law', with 'glaring lapses and procedural irregularities in the filing of the reference'.

In April 2022, former Prime Minister Imran Khan admitted that the filing of the reference against Justice Isa had been a 'mistake', and that 'relevant officials had misguided his government about the facts of the case'.

However, Prime Minister Imran Khan's government had filed a 'curative review' seeking review of the Supreme Court's decision. In July 2022, the Federal Cabinet led by Prime Minister Shahbaz Sharif announced that it would withdraw the 'curative review'.

Transparency and Disclosure 
In response to a freedom of information request by the Womens Action Forum, Justice Isa was the only judge who published details of all his assets, income, and privileges on the Supreme Court website. His wife, Mrs. Sarina Isa also voluntarily did so.

References

Bibliography

 

1959 births
Living people
Hazara people
Justices of the Supreme Court of Pakistan
Pakistani jurists
Pakistani people of Hazara descent
People from Quetta
Karachi Grammar School alumni
Chief Justices of the Balochistan High Court
Qazi family